Çağlayan River or Fındıklı River (Laz language: Abu River) is one of the main water streams of Fındıklı in the eastern Black Sea Region of Turkey. Its name is Turkish for cascade.

Description  
Çağlayan River rises in Kaçkar Mountains in Fındıklı. It is a notable spawning place for Black Sea salmon. The Çağlayan River is also a popular place for amateur handline fishing.

References 

Rivers of Rize Province
Salmon
Tributaries of the Black Sea